Friendship Park is a half-acre binational park located along the United States-Mexico border in the San Diego–Tijuana region. Located within the larger Border Field State Park in California's San Diego county, the park includes the border fence dividing the two countries where residents of both countries can meet in person. On the U.S. side, the park used to be part of the Monument Mesa picnic area but is now wholly located on federal property under the Department of Homeland Security and is heavily monitored by U.S. Border Patrols 24 hours a day. To the south of this place is the Playas de Tijuana, Baja California. In 2022 the U.S. approved the construction of a wall, but announced soon after plans for the construction had been put on hold. In January 2023, it was announced that construction would proceed.

History 

In the 1850s, in the aftermath of the Mexican–American War, a joint commission from the United States and Mexico erected a pyramidal statue on a beachside bluff south of what is today Imperial Beach, California to mark the initial boundary point between Mexico and the United States. 

On August 18, 1971, the surrounding area in the United States was inaugurated as a California State Park by First Lady Pat Nixon. Celebrating the first phase of what was envisioned as "International Friendship Park," Mrs. Nixon declared, "I hope there won't be a fence too long here." 

Until 1994, there was only a simple barbed wire fence, and Americans and Mexicans could meet on the border under the supervision of the U.S. Border Patrol. Various social events have taken place in this park, including yoga classes, religious services, weddings, dances and baptisms.

Border security was tightened in the 1990s and again after the September 11 terrorism attacks in 2001. During that time, people on opposite sides of the border were still able to touch and pass objects through the barrier.

In 2009, the U.S. Department of Homeland Security closed down Friendship Park and a second parallel fence was created which stretches into the Pacific Ocean that includes barbed wires, sensors, and surveillance cameras. A  border patrol access road was also created, along with a third  of steel bars. In late 2011 and early 2012, the "Surf Fence" Project replaced the old bars that form a barrier on the beach and extended it  into the ocean.

In 2012, under pressure from the public and activist groups, the federal government agreed to reopen the park with an outer perimeter fence blocking access to the public except when permitted by the U.S. Border Patrol, which controls access to the park. The fence dividing the two countries is now a thick, dense steel mesh that is difficult to see through and only allows the touching of fingertips.

In 2022 the Biden administration approved a Trump-era project to complete a section of the border wall. In August, U.S. Customs and Border Protection agreed to pause plans for a double border wall that critics say would effectively destroy the park.

Children's Day 
At the private request of the humanitarian organization Border Angels, the U.S. government allowed a gate in the fence at Friendship Park to be opened briefly on Children's Day, a holiday celebrated in April in Mexico. The first such event took place in 2013, and it was repeated in 2015 and 2016. Border Patrol officers lifted a steel girder that locks a solitary gate in the fence from the U.S. side. Children and adults from a small number of pre-selected families divided by the border were allowed to meet and embrace briefly. San Diego Customs Border Protection (CBP) Sector chief Rodney Scott announced in April 2018 that the door opening event would no longer be allowed to take place. The reason for this decision was that Border Angels founder Enrique Morones had arranged for a wedding to take place, and the groom was a convicted, major drug smuggler. Border Patrol agents attended the wedding, which received widespread local, national and international media coverage. This was a great embarrassment for the San Diego CBP sector command. The Children's Day event is no longer being allowed, and it did not change the terms of access for the thousands of families who visit Friendship Park each year for the purpose of reuniting with their families.

Access

U.S. side 
The U.S. Border Patrol allows public access to the park on Saturdays and Sundays between 10:00 a.m. and 2:00 p.m. Border Patrol may limit access to the number of visitors allowed in the park and may check IDs. No item can be passed through the fence and doing so is a customs violation. Access to the park may discontinued according to the 2022-approved project to build a new wall that would not include gates for pedestrian access.

Mexico side 
There is no access limitation to the park from the Mexico side.

Friends of Friendship Park 
Friends of Friendship Park is an organization of community members working for unrestricted access to this historic border site.  The organization works on behalf of many families who depend on the park to see their families and friends.

See also

Initial Point of Boundary Between U.S. and Mexico

References

External links

 Friends of Friendship Park

Geography of San Diego–Tijuana
Mexico–United States border
Parks in San Diego County, California
Parks in Mexico
Tijuana